Norwood is a civil parish in the Harrogate district of North Yorkshire, England. According to the 2001 UK census, Norwood parish had a population of 200, increasing to 216 at the 2011 Census. The parish lies on the eastern side of the Washburn Valley, and includes the eastern side of Swinsty Reservoir.

There is no village in the parish.  The population is spread among a number of hamlets and scattered farms, including Norwood Bottom and Bland Hill.  Norwood Hall is a 17th-century Grade II listed building. Dob Park Bridge is a packhorse bridge, probably of 17th century origin, over the River Washburn.

Norwood is pronounced locally as "Norood", just as Warwick is pronounced "Warrick".

Until 1950 the parish was known as Clifton with Norwood.  It was historically a township in the parish of Fewston, and became a separate civil parish in 1866.

References

External links 

Civil parishes in North Yorkshire